The 1990–91 Saint Peter's Peacocks men's basketball team represented Saint Peter's College during the 1990–91 NCAA Division I men's basketball season. The Peacocks, led by fifth-year head coach Ted Fiore, played their home games at the Yanitelli Center and were members of the Metro Atlantic Athletic Conference. They finished the season 24–7, 11–5 in MAAC play to finish in third place. They defeated Niagara, La Salle, and Iona to win the MAAC tournament. As a result, they received the conference's automatic bid to the NCAA tournament – the first in school history – as the No. 12 seed in the Midwest region where they lost to Texas in the first round.

Roster

Schedule and results

|-
!colspan=9 style=| Regular season

|-
!colspan=9 style="|MAAC tournament

|-
!colspan=9 style="|NCAA tournament

References

Saint Peter's
Saint Peter's
Saint Peter's Peacocks men's basketball seasons
Saint Peter's Peacocks basketball
Saint Peter's Peacocks basketball